Astrakan is a 2022 French coming-of-age drama film directed by David Depesseville, starring Mirko Giannini, Jehnny Beth and Bastien Bouillon.

Cast
 Mirko Giannini as Samuel
 Jehnny Beth as Marie
 Bastien Bouillon as Clément
 Theo Costa-Marini as Luc
 Lorine Delin as Helene
 Cameron Bertrand
 Nathaël Bertrand

Reception
Neil Young of Screen Daily called the film an "engrossing exercise in empathetic humanism, unhurried and uninflected".

Georgia Del Don of Cineuropa wrote that the film is "far more" than a "precise account of the ambiguous and vertiginous time marking the transition from childhood to adolescence."

Martin Kudlac of ScreenAnarchy wrote that depite the film being a "social allegory disguised as a coming-of-age tale imbued with the latent cringe cruelty of Todd Solondz's poetics", the film "works" as a "concentrated representation of the agony and confusion of growing up."

References

External links
 
 

2022 drama films
French coming-of-age drama films